Alvin Jones (born 9 July 1994) is a Trinidadian footballer who plays as a right-back who currently plays for USL League One club Forward Madison.

International career
Jones played for the Trinidad and Tobago U23 team at the 2015 Pan American Games – Men's tournament. On October 10, 2017, he scored his first international goal against the United States in Couva, which resulted in a 2-1 victory that eliminated the United States from participating in the World Cup.

International goals
Scores and results list Trinidad and Tobago's goal tally first.

Personal life
He is the son of former Trinidadian international Kelvin and the younger brother of Trinidadian international Joevin.

References

External links

1994 births
Living people
Trinidad and Tobago footballers
W Connection F.C. players
OKC Energy FC players
Real Salt Lake players
Real Monarchs players
Forward Madison FC players
Major League Soccer players
USL Championship players
USL League One players
Trinidad and Tobago international footballers
Association football fullbacks
2019 CONCACAF Gold Cup players
2021 CONCACAF Gold Cup players
Footballers at the 2015 Pan American Games